The Shadow of the Desert (also released under its original title The Shadow of the East) is a 1924 American silent horror film directed by George Archainbaud. The film is based upon the novel The Shadow of the East by Edith Maude Hull, who also wrote the best-selling desert romance The Sheik.

Plot
As described in a review of the film in a film magazine, Barry Craven (Mayo) is a young Englishman living in India who has taken a native wife, Lolaire (Brent). Barry meets his old university friend Said (Kerry), a polished gentleman who is the son of an Algerian sheik. John Locke (Swickard) and his daughter Gillian (Harris) visit India, and Barry’s former love for Gillian returns; but he cannot marry her as he has a native wife. Crazed by jealousy, Lolaire kills herself. Barry is called back to England and marries Gillian. His Hindu servant Kunwar (Grassby), through his command of oriental mysticism, casts a spell on Barry that makes him feel remorse for his former wife Lolaire’s death. This remorse causes Barry to leave Gillian. He goes to the desert and joins Said, and while helping him fight a bandit chief, Gillian arrives on the scene. Said denies that he is with Barry and makes love to Gillian, who had previously repulsed him. A messenger comes to Said and tells him of Barry’s danger. Said repents, sends aid, rescues Barry, and restores Gillian to him. Barry’s servant Kunwar is killed and with his death the curse, which was the shadow of the east, is lifted.

Cast

Preservation
With no prints of The Shadow of the Desert located in any film archives, it is a lost film.

See also
1937 Fox vault fire
List of Fox Film films

References

External links 

1924 films
1924 lost films
1924 horror films
American horror films
American silent feature films
American black-and-white films
Films based on works by E. M. Hull
Films directed by George Archainbaud
Fox Film films
Lost horror films
Lost American films
1920s American films
Silent horror films
1920s English-language films